Praveen Dagar is an Indian politician and Member of Legislative Assembly from Bhartiya Janata Party in [Haryana]. He was elected to the Haryana Legislative Assembly from Hathin in the 2019 Haryana Legislative Assembly election as a member of the Bharatiya Janata Party.

Early life
Praveen Dagar was born on 1 January 1976 in Mandkola located in Hathin Tehsil of palwal district, Haryana, in a farmer family. His father Shri Ramji Lal Dagar is a farmer and politician who was known as a farmer leader and became an independent MLA in 1972. He started his political career by raising local issues of farmers and won his first election of Zila Parishad in 2005.

Education
Praveen Dagar completed his early education from Mandkola village. After completing his school education, he completed his graduation from Maharshi Dayanand University, Rohtak. After completing his graduation he started taking part in local politics and raising local issues.

Political life
In 2005, he entered politics as a farmer leader and raised local farmers' issues. He fought the Zila Parishad election and won his first election in 2005. This was starting off his political career and since then he is active in politics. In 2019 he got the ticket from Bharatiya Janata Party from Hathin assembly constituency and won his first election as Member of Assembly constituency.

References 

Living people
Bharatiya Janata Party politicians from Haryana
People from Gurgaon district
Haryana MLAs 2019–2024
1976 births